Pandalapaka is a village in Biccavolu in East Godavari District of Andhra Pradesh, India.

References

Villages in East Godavari district

Pandalapaka, East Godavari, Andhra Pradesh Pincode(533345) or Postoffice(Pandalapaka S.O) full details.